NGC 4473 is an elliptical galaxy located about 50 million light-years away in the constellation of Coma Berenices. It was discovered by astronomer William Herschel on April 8, 1784. NGC 4473 has an inclination of about 71°.   NGC 4473 is a member of a chain of galaxies called Markarian's Chain which is part of the larger Virgo Cluster of galaxies.

Globular clusters
NGC 4473 has an estimated population of 376 ± 97 globular clusters. The clusters may have formed from the result of multiple minor mergers that helped form the outer regions of the galaxy.

Counter–rotating features
NGC 4473 has two counter-rotating stellar discs embedded in the inner regions of the galaxy. They may have formed from the accretion of gas from outside the galaxy, or by the mergers of gas-rich galaxies.

Supermassive black hole
Using the HST and spectroscopic data from the ground to measure the motions of stars in the center of the galaxy,  Douglas Richstone and colleagues at the University of Michigan have concluded that NGC 4473 has a supermassive black hole with an estimated mass of roughly 100 million solar masses. Its diameter is estimated to be around 4.459 astronomical units (415 million mi).

See also 
 List of NGC objects (4001–5000)
 Messier 87
 M86
 NGC 4550 - Lenticular galaxy in the Virgo Cluster experiencing counter-rotation

Gallery

References

External links 

Elliptical galaxies
Coma Berenices
4473
Virgo Cluster
41228
7631
Astronomical objects discovered in 1784